Zachary David Alexander Efron (born October 18, 1987) is an American actor. He began acting professionally in the early 2000s and rose to prominence in the late 2000s for his leading role as Troy Bolton in the High School Musical trilogy (2006–2008). During this time, he also starred in the musical film Hairspray (2007) and the comedy film 17 Again (2009). Efron subsequently rose to mainstream prominence with starring roles in the films New Year's Eve (2011), The Lucky One (2012), The Paperboy (2012), Neighbors (2014), Dirty Grandpa (2016), Baywatch (2017), and The Greatest Showman (2017). He played Ted Bundy in Extremely Wicked, Shockingly Evil and Vile (2019). In 2021, he won a Daytime Emmy Award for the Netflix web documentary series Down to Earth with Zac Efron (2020–present).

Early life
Efron grew up in Arroyo Grande, California.  His father, David Efron, is an electrical engineer at Diablo Canyon Power Plant, and his mother, Starla Baskett, is an administrative assistant who also works at Diablo Canyon. Efron has a younger brother, Dylan, and a younger paternal half-sister, Olivia, and had, as he has described, a "normal childhood" in a middle-class family. His surname originates from Hebrew. His paternal grandfather is Jewish, and Efron has described himself as Jewish, though he was raised agnostically and did not practice religion as a child.

Efron has said that he would "flip out" if he got a "B" and not an "A" in school, as well as that he was a class clown. Efron subsequently worked in the theater The Great American Melodrama and Vaudeville, and began taking singing lessons. He performed in shows such as Gypsy; Peter Pan, or The Boy Who Wouldn't Grow Up; Little Shop of Horrors; and The Music Man. He was recommended to an agent in Los Angeles by his drama teacher, Robyn Metchik, the mother of actor Aaron Michael Metchik. Efron was later signed to the Creative Artists Agency.

Efron graduated from Arroyo Grande High School in 2006 and was then accepted into the University of Southern California but did not enroll. He also attended Pacific Conservatory of the Performing Arts, a theatre company operating out of Allan Hancock College, a community college located in Santa Maria, California, where he performed in 2000 and 2001.

Career

2002–2009: Early career and High School Musical 

Efron began acting in the early 2000s with guest roles on several television series including Firefly, ER, and The Guardian. In 2004, he began appearing as a recurring character in the first season of the WB series Summerland. For the show's second season, which aired in 2005, he was promoted to the main cast. He also appeared in some films, including the Lifetime television film Miracle Run (2004), for which he earned a Young Artist Award nomination for his performance as one of two autistic twins.

Efron's career reached a turning point with the teen musical television film High School Musical (2006), which premiered on the Disney Channel in January 2006. The film, which has been described as a modern adaptation of Romeo and Juliet, saw Efron playing the male lead Troy Bolton, a high school basketball player who feels conflicted when he finds himself interested in participating in the school musical with Gabriella Montez (Vanessa Hudgens), a girl from the scholastic decathlon team. The film became a major success and helped Efron gain recognition among teenage audiences. The film's soundtrack was certified quadruple platinum by the RIAA, and was one of the best-selling albums of the year in the United States. Efron's recordings of the film's songs were not included in the final cut, and the majority of his parts were sung by Drew Seeley. In his subsequent musical films, Efron did his own singing.

Efron was next seen as Link Larkin in the musical comedy film Hairspray (2007), based on the 2002 Broadway musical of the same name. The film became a major commercial and critical success upon its release in July 2007. Later that year, he reprised his role of Troy Bolton in High School Musical 2 (2007), which aired on the Disney Channel in August 2007.

Efron again reprised his role in High School Musical 3: Senior Year (2008), the first film in the High School Musical franchise to receive a theatrical release. The film became a major blockbuster at the box office, and received mixed to positive reviews from critics. He followed this with the commercially successful comedy 17 Again (2009) about a 37-year-old man (Matthew Perry) who is transformed into his 17-year-old self (Efron) after a chance accident.

2009–present: Other roles and mainstream success 

Efron's next release was Richard Linklater's period drama Me and Orson Welles, which premiered at the Toronto International Film Festival in September 2008 and received a wide release in late 2009. The film earned mostly positive reviews from critics. He then played the title role in the supernatural romantic drama Charlie St. Cloud (2010), which became a moderate success at the box office despite receiving mostly negative reviews from critics.

Efron appeared as a part of the large ensemble cast in Garry Marshall's New Year's Eve (2011), which depicted a series of holiday vignettes of different groups of characters. The film received almost unanimously negative reviews from critics, but became a major success at the box office. He also played a supporting role in the critically successful Liberal Arts (2012), which premiered at the Sundance Film Festival in January 2012 and received a limited release later that year. He also starred in The Paperboy (2012), which premiered at the Cannes Film Festival in May 2012 and received a wider release later that year. The film received mixed to negative reviews from critics.

After lending his voice to the commercially successful computer-animated film The Lorax (2012), he appeared as the male lead in the romantic drama The Lucky One (2012), based on the novel of the same name by Nicholas Sparks. The film became a major box office success despite negative reviews from critics. He also starred in the drama At Any Price, which premiered at the 2012 Venice International Film Festival, and the historical drama Parkland, which premiered at the 2013 Venice International Film Festival. Both films received mixed reviews from critics.

Efron's first release of 2014 was the romantic comedy That Awkward Moment, on which he was also an executive producer. The film, which starred Efron as one of three bachelors in New York City, became a moderate commercial success despite receiving mostly negative reviews from critics.

Later in 2014, Efron was seen in the adult comedy Neighbors (2014). The film revolved around a young couple (Seth Rogen and Rose Byrne) who struggle to raise their baby daughter while living next to the house of a wild fraternity led by its president, played by Efron. The film became a major commercial success and earned mostly positive reviews from critics, who also added that Efron had successfully shed his "Disney pretty boy" image.

Efron's only release in 2015 was the moderately successful We Are Your Friends (2015), in which he played a struggling DJ. In January 2016, he starred with Robert De Niro in the adult comedy Dirty Grandpa, about a straitlaced young man who begrudgingly indulges his grandfather's unhinged personality by taking him on a vacation to Florida. The film received mostly negative reviews from critics for its crude humor, but became a commercial success upon its release. He subsequently starred in the comedy sequel Neighbors 2: Sorority Rising, which became a commercial and critical success upon its release in May 2016. The film followed the same couple who team up with their former rival (Efron) to take down a hard-partying sorority led by a freshman (Chloë Grace Moretz). His third 2016 comedy, released in July, was Mike and Dave Need Wedding Dates.

In 2017, Efron starred alongside Dwayne Johnson in Baywatch, an action comedy film version of the television series of the same name, released in May. Also in 2017, Efron had a supporting role in two biographical films released in December, The Disaster Artist, a comedy-drama directed by and starring James Franco, and, as Phillip, in the musical The Greatest Showman. Both were nominated for the Golden Globe Award for Best Motion Picture – Musical or Comedy.

In 2019, Efron played a drug-addled libertine in the Harmony Korine film The Beach Bum. He also starred as serial killer Ted Bundy in Extremely Wicked, Shockingly Evil and Vile, alongside Lily Collins as Bundy's girlfriend. The film premiered at Sundance in early 2019 and was released by Netflix on May 3.

In 2020, Efron voiced Fred Jones in Warner Bros.' Scooby-Doo animated film, Scoob! In 2021, he won a Daytime Emmy Award for Outstanding Daytime Program Host for the Netflix web documentary series Down to Earth with Zac Efron.

In 2022, he starred in the survival thriller Gold, directed by Anthony Hayes, and headlined the horror film Firestarter, a remake of the 1984 film based upon the novel of the same name by Stephen King, directed by Keith Thomas. Also that year, he starred in Peter Farrelly's Vietnam War–set comedy The Greatest Beer Run Ever, which received mixed reviews.

He is set to appear in Sean Durkin's The Iron Claw, about the Von Erich family of wrestlers.

Other work 
In 2010, Efron started his own production company under Warner Bros., Ninjas Runnin' Wild. The company played a part in the production of his films Dirty Grandpa, That Awkward Moment, and Extremely Wicked, Shockingly Evil and Vile. In 2019, Efron's brother Dylan, who also plays a role in the company, stated that Ninjas Runnin' Wild has started to produce more digital content in addition to their traditional film work.

Efron announced the creation of his YouTube channel in March 2019. The video sharing platform hosts two weekly series. "Off the Grid" follows Efron and his brother Dylan as they participate in outdoor activities and trips without electronic devices—with the exception of a video camera in order to document their experiences. "Gym Time" spotlights fitness and nutrition, with Efron informing his viewers that he plans to "train with celebrities, athletes, and interesting people". YouTube received backlash for promoting Efron's new channel in a post made from their official Twitter account. Some YouTube users accused the platform of promoting a mainstream celebrity's account, which they feared would overshadow lesser known creators.

Personal life
Efron was on the Forbes Celebrity 100 list in 2008 at number 92, with estimated earnings of $5.8 million from June 2007 to June 2008. In April 2009, his personal wealth equaled about $10 million. In May 2015, Efron's net worth was $18million.

People magazine reported in 2007 that Efron and Vanessa Hudgens began dating in 2005 during the filming of High School Musical, although Us magazine reported, after the two broke up in December 2010, that they "met in 2005 while making the first High School Musical flick, and became a romantic item about two years later." Efron began a relationship with model and entrepreneur Sami Miró in September 2014. The couple split in April 2016.

In March 2014, Efron engaged in a fight with a homeless man on Skid Row. Law enforcement officials did not make any arrests because they viewed it as mutual combat.

Efron turned to transcendental meditation (TM) to help decompress after struggling to separate himself from his role as serial killer Ted Bundy in his movie. "I really love TM, transcendental meditation. I did TM on the way home. Not while driving, but when you're shooting a movie, one thing we can afford is a ride home, so on the way home I just do some TM and try to phase out of it."

Efron moved to Australia after selling his Los Angeles home in early 2021 and purchased a property in Byron Bay while working on a number of projects there.

Health issues 
Efron sought treatment in early 2013 after struggling with alcoholism and substance abuse. He has been sober since June 2013. In November 2013, Efron had to have his jaw wired shut after breaking it in a fall at home. He revealed in 2022 that he almost died during this incident, and that it was responsible for his facial swelling, apparent in a viral 2021 video for Bill Nye's Earth Day Musical. 

In December 2019, Efron contracted a serious and potentially life-threatening illness, a "form of typhoid or similar bacterial infection", while filming his adventure series Killing Zac Efron in Papua New Guinea. He was flown to St Andrews War Memorial Hospital in Brisbane, Australia, and was treated before flying back home on December 25. He recovered with little issue.

Efron was a vegan for two years until 2022, when he began intermittent fasting, and reintroduced meat into his diet after undergoing a series of food sensitivity tests.

In 2022, Efron opened up about his struggles with mental illnesses including insomnia, agoraphobia, and depression. He developed insomnia and depression after taking diuretics for a long period to prepare for his role in Baywatch.

Filmography

Film

Television

Music videos

Discography

Singles

Other charted songs

Awards and nominations

References

External links

1987 births
Living people
21st-century American male actors
21st-century American singers
21st-century American male singers
American agnostics
American emigrants to Australia
American people of Jewish descent
American male child actors
American male film actors
American male television actors
American male voice actors
Daytime Emmy Award winners
Jewish agnostics
Male actors from California
Pacific Conservatory of the Performing Arts alumni
People from Arroyo Grande, California
People from San Luis Obispo, California
Singers from California